This is a list of diplomatic missions resident in Slovenia. At present, the capital city of Ljubljana hosts 36 embassies. Several other countries have honorary consuls to provide emergency services to their citizens. Several other countries have non-resident embassies accredited from other regional capitals, such as Vienna, in Austria, and Rome, in Italy, for diplomatic and consular purposes.

Embassies 
Ljubljana

Gallery

Consulates General / Consulates

Koper

Kranj

Lendava
 (Consulate-General)

Non-resident embassies accredited to Slovenia 
Vienna:

 

Rome:

  

 

 

Budapest:

 

Berlin:

 

Other cities:

 (Andorra la Vella)
 (Prague)
 (Geneva)
 (Brussels)
 (London)
 (Prague)
 (Reykjavík)
 (Valletta)
 (Bucharest)
 (The Hague)
 (San Marino)
 (Brussels)
 (Moscow)

Closed missions

See also 
 Foreign relations of Slovenia

Notes

References

External links 
 Embassies in Slovenia

Slovenia

Diplomatic missions